Burnell Michael Wallace III (born August 1, 1986) is an American former professional football player who was a wide receiver in the National Football League (NFL). He played college football for Ole Miss Rebels, and was selected by the Pittsburgh Steelers in the third round of the 2009 NFL Draft with the 84th overall pick. He also played for the Miami Dolphins, Minnesota Vikings, Baltimore Ravens, and Philadelphia Eagles. Throughout his career, Wallace was known for his speed after finishing with a time of 4.33-seconds in the 40-yard dash at the NFL Scouting Combine.

Early years
Wallace was born to his parents Burnell and Sonjia Wallace in New Orleans, Louisiana. He grew up in the Cut-Off section of the Algiers neighborhood of New Orleans. He attended O. Perry Walker High School, where he played football on both offense and defense and his teammates included future New Orleans Saints cornerback Keenan Lewis. After seeing limited playing time as a junior (four receptions while playing mostly on defense), Wallace had an outstanding senior season, catching 60 passes for 1,039 yards with 19 touchdowns. He received first-team All-State honors as a wide receiver, earned league and district MVP honors as well as All-league, All-Metro, All-West Bank and All-West Bank MVP following his senior season. He also returned four punts and four kickoffs for touchdowns, giving him 27 for the season and 162 points, with seven more scores called back due to penalties. Wallace set the school records for total points and kick return touchdowns.

Also a standout track & field athlete in high school, Wallace earned All-State honors in the 100-meter dash as a senior. As a junior, Wallace ran the anchor leg for the O.P. Walker 4 × 100 meter relay squad at the 2004 State Outdoor Championships, helping them earn a fourth-place finish with a school-record time of 41.81 seconds. In addition, he also owned a 4.4-second 40-yard dash and had a 36-inch vertical jump.

Wallace was rated as a two-star recruit by Rivals.com. SuperPrep named him the 17th-ranked college prospect in the state of Louisiana and was a member of its 2004 Southwest Team. Wallace was also named the league MVP, district MVP, and All-West Bank MVP. He was also named an All-State, All-league, All-Metro, All-West Bank player. He committed to Oregon State on February 4, 2004.

College career
In 2004, Wallace accepted a scholarship from Oregon State after insisting that they also recruit his best friend and high school teammate Keenan Lewis, who was one year ahead of Wallace in school. However, Wallace later decided not to join Lewis at Oregon State but instead to follow his high school coach, Frank Wilson, who had joined the coaching staff at the University of Mississippi.

As a true freshman in 2005, Wallace played in 10 games.  In 2006, he started all 12 games as a split end. He recorded two touchdown receptions to tie for first on the team. At Kentucky, he had two receptions for 65 yards. Against Wake Forest, he had two receptions for 36 yards. At Alabama, he had his first career touchdown on a 55-yard catch from Brent Schaeffer. He had one catch for 38 yards against Mississippi State.

In 2007, Wallace saw action in all 12 games with nine starts as a split end. He recorded 716 receiving yards and had two 100-yard games. He had seven catches of at least 40 yards and three of at least 50 yards. He ranked first in the Southeastern Conference (SEC) in yards per catch with 18.8. He was named third-team All-SEC.

In 2008, he played in six games, recording 39 receptions for 784 yards and seven touchdowns. He also had ten carries for 92 yards. In the 2009 Cotton Bowl against Texas Tech, he caught a 41-yard touchdown pass from Jevan Snead. Wallace participated in the 2009 Senior Bowl on the South team, as a replacement for a no-show wide receiver invitee.

Professional career
At the 2009 NFL Scouting Combine, Wallace finished second overall in the 40-yard dash with an official 4.33-second time.

Pittsburgh Steelers
The Pittsburgh Steelers selected Wallace in the third round (84th overall) of the 2009 NFL Draft. Wallace was the 11th wide receiver chosen in the 2009 draft. On June 18, 2009, Wallace signed a three-year contract with the Steelers worth $1.740 million which included a $555,000 signing bonus. In Pittsburgh he was reunited with former high school teammate Keenan Lewis, whom the Steelers selected just twelve picks after Wallace.

Wallace achieved his first 100-yard receiving game against the Cincinnati Bengals in the  season; he had 7 receptions for 102 yards. On December 20, Wallace caught a game winning pass while falling out of bounds as time expired to defeat the Green Bay Packers, 37-36. The catch made him a hero in Pittsburgh and the receiver was named the winner of the "Joe Greene Great Performance Award", which is awarded each season to the outstanding Steelers rookie. It was only his second catch of the game, but the first had been a 60-yard touchdown reception on the very first Steelers offensive snap.

Wallace finished his rookie season leading the entire league in average yards per reception with 19.4 yards.

2010 season
Following his promising rookie season and Santonio Holmes' trade to the New York Jets, Wallace was moved up the depth chart in 2010 to the #2 receiver spot behind Hines Ward.

In 2010, Wallace had a standout second season with the Steelers, establishing himself as one of the NFL's elite wideouts with 1,257 yards receiving (third most in the AFC) and 10 touchdowns.  Wallace led the NFL with seven 100-yard receiving games.

Wallace averaged 21.0 yards per catch in 2010, the most of any AFC receiver. Wallace just missed becoming the third receiver in NFL history to lead the league in yardage per reception in his first two seasons after leading with 19.4 as a rookie. DeSean Jackson of Philadelphia averaged 22.5 yards per catch in 2010.

During Super Bowl XLV, Wallace had nine catches for 89 yards and a touchdown. He recorded a tackle after an interception from quarterback Ben Roethlisberger. It was Wallace's first and only Super Bowl appearance.

In the 2011 offseason Mike Wallace stated that he would like to reach 2,000 yards.

2011 season
Against the Arizona Cardinals, he and Roethlisberger connected for a 95-yard touchdown reception, becoming the longest in Steelers history. On December 27, 2011 Wallace was selected to the Pro Bowl for the AFC. Wallace finished the season with 8 touchdown receptions, 1,193 receiving yards and 72 receptions for an average total of 16.6 yards per catch. The Steelers were eliminated in the Wild Card round of the playoffs by the Denver Broncos 29-23. Wallace finished the game with only 3 receptions and 29 receiving yards. He did, however, score a rushing touchdown in the third quarter.

2012 season
After the 2011 season, Wallace held out from all of the team's OTAs, and held out the majority of training camp. He reported on August 28, 2012. Wallace became a free agent at the conclusion of the 2012 season.

Miami Dolphins

On March 12, 2013, Wallace was reportedly signed by the Miami Dolphins in a five-year deal worth $60 million.  Wallace's father revealed that despite the fact that the Minnesota Vikings offered a bigger contract, Mike decided to move his home to a warmer Miami.

Minnesota Vikings
 
On March 13, 2015, the Dolphins traded Wallace and a 2015 seventh-round pick to the Minnesota Vikings in exchange for a 2015 fifth-round pick (Jay Ajayi).

In Week 1, Wallace led the Vikings with six catches and 63 receiving yards on seven targets in their 20-3 loss to the San Francisco 49ers on Monday night. Wallace caught his first touchdown pass as a member of the Minnesota Vikings against the Denver Broncos in Week 4. The catch came late in the first half, right after linebacker Anthony Barr recorded his first career interception. He finished with eight catches for 83 yards. For the year Wallace totaled the fewest catches, yards and yards per reception of any season in his career (although the Vikings as a whole put up far fewer passing yards than the Steelers or Dolphins).

On March 8, 2016, Wallace was released by the Vikings; he had 39 receptions for 473 yards in his only season in Minnesota.

Baltimore Ravens
On March 15, 2016, Wallace signed a two-year, $11.5 million contract with the Baltimore Ravens. In the Ravens' season opener against the Buffalo Bills, he scored his team's only touchdown off a 66-yard catch and run, as he and the Ravens won 13–7. The following week, he scored two touchdowns in a 20-point comeback victory over the Cleveland Browns. In Week 9, against his former team the Pittsburgh Steelers, Wallace caught a 95-yard touchdown from Joe Flacco in a 21–14 victory.

Philadelphia Eagles
On March 22, 2018, Wallace signed a one-year, $2.5 million contract with the Philadelphia Eagles. In Week 2, against the Tampa Bay Buccaneers, Wallace suffered a fractured fibula and was expected to miss a few weeks. He was placed on injured reserve on September 19, 2018. He was activated off injured reserve on December 24, 2018.

NFL career statistics

References

External links

 Pittsburgh Steelers bio 
 Ole Miss football bio

1986 births
American Conference Pro Bowl players
American football wide receivers
Baltimore Ravens players
Living people
Minnesota Vikings players
Miami Dolphins players
Ole Miss Rebels football players
Pittsburgh Steelers players
Players of American football from New Orleans
Philadelphia Eagles players